Shubhashish Jha is an Indian television actor  who is best known as Vidhaan Rawat in Jiji Maa  and then notably as Jijaji in Jijaji Chhat Parr Koii Hai.

Early life
Shubhashish Jha was born on 8th March 1991 in Purnia, Bihar. Jha attended Don Bosco, Patna and Delhi Public School, Vasant Kunj, New Delhi. Then, he pursued B.Tech in Computer Science and Technology from Manipal Institute of Technology (MIT), Manipal, India.

Career 
Jha started his acting career as a boxer in Channel V India show Twist Wala Love opposite Twinkle Patel. In the same year, he was roped in to play the parallel lead role of Sameer in Zee TV popular show Qubool Hai, for which he was much appreciated. In 2017, Jha was roped in to play the parallel lead of Vidhaan Rawat opposite Bhavika Sharma in Jiji Maa and rose to fame with this role.

Jha was last seen playing the main lead and titular role of Jijaji in SAB TV series Jijaji Chhat Parr Koii Hai opposite Hiba Nawab. Jha would also be making his film debut with the upcoming film Hurdang.

Filmography

Television

Films

See also 
 List of Indian actors
 List of Indian television actors

References

External links
 

Living people
Indian television actors
Indian male soap opera actors
21st-century Indian male actors
Indian male models
Indian male television actors
Male actors in Hindi television
People from Bihar
Actors from Bihar
1991 births